Tricholoma zangii is a mushroom of the agaric genus Tricholoma (section Caligata). The species was originally described by mycologist Mu Zang in 1990, who called it Tricholoma quercicola. It was later discovered that this name was a later homonym of a North American species described by William Alphonso Murrill in 1949, and a new name was needed.

Its recorded collection locations in Sichuan, China, include Miyi, Yajiang, and Xiangcheng. The popular pine mushroom (Tricholoma matsutake) is closely related and similar in appearance. It grows, however, at lower elevations than T. zangii—typically —under pine, spruce, and hemlock. T. zangii also has a paler brown cap, and less intense odor.

See also
List of Tricholoma species

References

zangii
Fungi described in 2003
Fungi of China